Everything Is Possible: The Very Best of Living Colour is a greatest hits compilation by Living Colour, released in 2006. The title is taken from a lyric in the song "Type." Everything is possible, but nothing is real.

Track listing
Tracks 1-6 are from Vivid. Tracks 7-11 are from Time's Up. Tracks 12 and 13 are from Stain. Other tracks from releases noted.

Personnel
 Corey Glover - vocals, rhythm guitar (track 8)
 Vernon Reid - lead guitar
 Will Calhoun - drums
 Muzz Skillings - bass (tracks 1-11,14 & 17)
 Doug Wimbish - bass (tracks 12, 13, 15, & 16)

References

2006 greatest hits albums
Living Colour albums
Epic Records compilation albums